"Cold Hands, Warm Heart" is an episode of the original The Outer Limits television show. It first aired on September 26, 1964, during the second season. The episode features William Shatner in the lead role as a space explorer, not long before he was cast  as Captain Kirk in Star Trek. Shatner's Outer Limits character is involved in a mission called "Project Vulcan".

The episode was a Star Trek "preunion", as three of the co-stars would later have guest roles in television or film episodes of the series.  Malachi Throne portrayed Commodore Mendez in the episode "The Menagerie".  Lawrence Montaigne portrayed the Romulan Decius in the episode "Balance of Terror", and the Vulcan Stonn in the episode "Amok Time".  Montaigne was also considered for the original role of Spock on that series. James Sikking would later appear as Captain Styles in the film Star Trek III: The Search for Spock (1984).

Opening narration
"The most brilliant planet in our solar system is Venus, named for the Goddess of Love. It is closer to Earth than any other planet –twenty-eight million miles away. Until sometime in the last half of the twentieth century it is still a planet shrouded in mystery, enveloped in a heavy blanket of clouds and steam. Because its surface temperature was believed to be several times that of Earth's, it was not thought possible for Man to reach Venus and come back... until one day, somebody did it."

Plot
After completing the first crewed mission to orbit Venus, astronaut Jeff Barton returns to Earth with recurring nightmares and an increasing inability to stay warm. Barton's condition continues to worsen and is accompanied by a peculiar webbing of his fingers.  Only after his nightmares become more vivid does he recall an unrevealed alien encounter in the Venusian atmosphere. Barton's doctors suspect the astronaut had been genetically affected by his mission, and they then struggle to treat and cure him before his mutations completely take over.

Closing narration
"The eternal, never-ceasing search for knowledge often leads to dark and dangerous places. Sometimes it demands risks not only of those who are searching, but of others who love them. These, in their own special way, know that knowledge is never wasted, nor is love."

Cast

Notes

External links

The Outer Limits (1963 TV series season 2) episodes
1964 American television episodes
Venus in television
Works about astronauts